X security may refer to:

X Window authorization
Security categories in India